Mickey's Parrot is an animated short film produced by Walt Disney, distributed by RKO Radio Pictures and released on September 9, 1938. The film was directed by Ben Sharpsteen and animated by Frenchy de Trémaudan, Louie Schmittt, Chuck Couch, Eddie Strickland, Clyde Geronimi, Paul Satterfield, Archie Robin, Don Patterson. It was the 102nd short in the Mickey Mouse film series to be released, and the fourth for that year.

Plot
In this short, a talking parrot escapes from a truck and enters the home of Mickey and Pluto, who hear news of a killer on the loose, and mistake the parrot for the killer.

Voice cast
 Mickey Mouse: Walt Disney
 Pluto: Pinto Colvig
 Parrot: Walt Disney
 Radio announcer: unknown

Releases
1938 – Original theatrical release
1957 – The Mickey Mouse Club, episode #3.24 (TV)
c. 1972 – The Mouse Factory, episode #1.7: "Water Sports" (TV)
c. 1983 – Good Morning, Mickey!, episode No. 1 (TV)
1989 – The Magical World of Disney, episode #33.15: "Mickey's Happy Valentine Special" (TV)
c. 1992 – Mickey's Mouse Tracks, episode No. 16 (TV)
c. 1992 – Donald's Quack Attack, episode No. 34 (TV)
1998 – The Ink and Paint Club, episode #39: "Minnie Mouse" (TV)
2011 – Have a Laugh!, episode No. 25 (TV)

Home media
The short was released on December 4, 2001, on Walt Disney Treasures: Mickey Mouse in Living Color.

Additional releases include:
1981 – "Mickey Mouse and Donald Duck Cartoon Collections Volume Three" (VHS)
1989 – "Cartoon Classics: Mickey and the Gang" (VHS)

References

External links

 
 

1938 short films
1938 animated films
1930s Disney animated short films
Mickey Mouse short films
Films directed by Ben Sharpsteen
Films produced by Walt Disney
Films set on ships
Films scored by Leigh Harline
Films scored by Oliver Wallace
Animated films about birds
1930s color films
1930s English-language films
American animated short films
Animated films about mice
Animated films about dogs
RKO Pictures short films
RKO Pictures animated short films
1930s American films